Kedrovka is a rural locality (a selo) in Verkh-Neninsky Selsoviet, Yeltsovsky District, Altai Krai, Russia. The population was 26 as of 2013. There is 1 street.

Geography 
Kedrovka is located 54 km southeast of Yeltsovka (the district's administrative centre) by road. Makaryevka is the nearest rural locality.

References 

Rural localities in Yeltsovsky District